Magic Christian Music is the second studio album by the British rock band Badfinger, released on 9 January 1970 on Apple Records. It was the first release under the band's new name as Badfinger. The band had previously released the album Maybe Tomorrow, in 1969, under the name The Iveys. Three tracks from the LP are featured in the film The Magic Christian, which also gives the album its title. However, Magic Christian Music is not an official soundtrack album for the film.

History
The film soundtrack for The Magic Christian featured three new songs by Badfinger that had been commissioned for the film, including their US/UK top-10 hit "Come and Get It"', which opened the film, and "Carry on Till Tomorrow", the title theme. The soundtrack album, which also included incidental music by Ken Thorne, had originally been scheduled for release on Apple Records, but the addition of the Thunderclap Newman song "Something in the Air" to the movie prevented that. Instead, the soundtrack album was released on the little-known Commonwealth United Records label in the US and on Pye in the UK. As a result, it received little promotion in the US and remained mostly unknown to American record buyers.

To capitalize on this gap, Apple Records released its own "pseudo-soundtrack". Apple combined the film's three Badfinger songs with four unreleased songs and seven older tracks (released by the group when they were still known as the Iveys) on the album Maybe Tomorrow, which had been quickly pulled off the market in 1969 after having only been released in Germany, Japan and Italy. The previously released Iveys songs were specially re-mixed for this album, significantly improving their sound quality in the process. One of them, "Fisherman", was also edited for this release.

The three Badfinger tracks used in the film -- "Come and Get It", "Rock of All Ages" and "Carry on Till Tomorrow"—bear the strongest "Beatle connection". They were produced by Paul McCartney (the first was also composed by McCartney), and the strings on "Carry on Till Tomorrow" were arranged and conducted by Beatles producer George Martin. The other tracks on the album were produced by Tony Visconti (six songs, including both Iveys singles and the last recording made, "Crimson Ship") and Mal Evans (five songs).

Badfinger's line-up on these tracks includes bassist/vocalist Ron Griffiths, but Evans doubled on bass on "Midnight Sun", "Crimson Ship" and "Rock of All Ages" after Griffiths fell ill during the sessions. Griffiths departed The Iveys at the end of the McCartney sessions in late 1969, prior to the name change from The Iveys to Badfinger, which led to his exclusion from the credits and pictures on the album (although Griffiths does appear on the picture sleeve for "Come and Get It"). Guitarist Joey Molland was eventually added as Griffiths' replacement, causing Tom Evans to move from guitar to bass, but Molland's addition came after the album art had been prepared, so only Pete Ham, Tom Evans and Mike Gibbins are pictured on the cover.

The album peaked at number 55 on the US charts.

Track listing
The following track listing is from the original UK issue of the album, and is also replicated on CD reissues. The original American LP had a rearranged order and two tracks missing ("Angelique" and "Give It a Try").

Tracks marked (*) were originally released by The Iveys on the album Maybe Tomorrow.

Digital bonus tracks (2010 remaster)
 "Dear Angie" [Mono Mix] – 2:35
 "Think About the Good Times" [Mono Mix] – 2:22
 "No Escaping Your Love" [Mono mix] – 2:01
 "Arthur" [Remix] – 3:15
 "Storm in a Teacup" [Mono Mix] – 2:30
 "Yesterday Ain't Coming Back" [Mono Mix] – 2:55

Personnel
Pete Ham – lead and backing vocals, lead and rhythm guitars, keyboards
Tom Evans – lead and backing vocals, rhythm guitar, bass guitar on "Crimson Ship", "Midnight Sun", and "Rock of All Ages"
Ron Griffiths – bass guitar (except as noted), backing vocals, lead vocals on "Dear Angie" and "Give it A Try"
Mike Gibbins – drums, vocals

Additional contributors
Paul McCartney – piano on "Rock of All Ages", percussion on "Come and Get It"
Nicky Hopkins – piano on "See-Saw Granpa"
Bill Collins – piano on "Knocking Down Our Home"

References

Badfinger albums
1970 debut albums
Apple Records albums
Albums produced by Paul McCartney
Albums produced by Tony Visconti
Capitol Records albums
Albums recorded at Trident Studios
Albums recorded at IBC Studios
Albums conducted by George Martin
Albums recorded at Olympic Sound Studios